Juanra is a Spanish nickname that is short for "Juan Ramón". Notable people include:

Juanra Bonet (born 1974), Spanish television presenter
Juanra (footballer, born 1980), full name Juan Ramón Cabrero Obrer, Spanish football right-back
Juanra (futsal, born 1982), full name Juan Ramón Calvo Rodríguez, Spanish futsal midfielder
Juanra (footballer, born 1995), full name Juan Ramón Gómez-Pimpollo López, Spanish football right-back